This article lists all described species of the spider family Linyphiidae as of May 14, 2020, from Q to Z. Some genera have been updated to the World Spider Catalog version 21.0 .

Racata
Racata Millidge, 1995
 Racata brevis Tanasevitch, 2019 — Indonesia
 Racata grata Millidge, 1995 — Krakatau
 Racata laxa Tanasevitch, 2019 — Indonesia
 Racata sumatera Tanasevitch, 2019 — Indonesia

Rhabdogyna
Rhabdogyna Millidge, 1985
 Rhabdogyna chiloensis Millidge, 1985 — Chile
 Rhabdogyna patagonica (Tullgren, 1901) — Chile

Ringina
Ringina Tambs-Lyche, 1954
 Ringina antarctica (Hickman, 1939) — Crozet Islands

Russocampus
Russocampus Tanasevitch, 2004
 Russocampus polchaninovae Tanasevitch, 2004 — Russia

Ryojius
Ryojius Saito & Ono, 2001
 Ryojius japonicus Saito & Ono, 2001 — Japan
 Ryojius nanyuensis (Chen & Yin, 2000) — China
 Ryojius occidentalis Saito & Ono, 2001 — Japan

Saaristoa
Saaristoa Millidge, 1978
 Saaristoa abnormis (Blackwall, 1841) — Palearctic
 Saaristoa ebinoensis (Oi, 1979) — Japan
 Saaristoa firma (O. P.-Cambridge, 1905) — Europe
 Saaristoa nipponica (Saito, 1984) — Japan
 Saaristoa sammamish (Levi & Levi, 1955) — USA

Sachaliphantes
Sachaliphantes Saaristo & Tanasevitch, 2004
 Sachaliphantes sachalinensis (Tanasevitch, 1988) — Russia, China, Japan

Saitonia
Saitonia Eskov, 1992
 Saitonia kawaguchikonis Saito & Ono, 2001 — Japan
 Saitonia longicephala (Saito, 1988) — Japan
 Saitonia muscus (Saito, 1989) — Japan
 Saitonia ojiroensis (Saito, 1990) — Japan
 Saitonia orientalis (Oi, 1960) — Japan
 Saitonia pilosus Seo, 2011 — Korea

Saloca
Saloca Simon, 1926
 Saloca diceros (O. P.-Cambridge, 1871) — Europe
 Saloca elevata Wunderlich, 2011 — Turkey
 Saloca gorapaniensis Wunderlich, 1983 — Nepal
 Saloca khumbuensis Wunderlich, 1983 — Nepal
 Saloca kulczynskii Miller & Kratochvil, 1939 — Central, Eastern Europe
 Saloca ryvkini Eskov & Marusik, 1994 — Russia

Satilatlas
Satilatlas Keyserling, 1886
 Satilatlas arenarius (Emerton, 1911) — USA, Canada
 Satilatlas britteni (Jackson, 1913) — Europe
 Satilatlas carens Millidge, 1981 — Canada
 Satilatlas gentilis Millidge, 1981 — USA
 Satilatlas gertschi Millidge, 1981 — Canada
 Satilatlas insolens Millidge, 1981 — USA
 Satilatlas marxi Keyserling, 1886 — Russia, Alaska, Canada
 Satilatlas marxi matanuskae (Chamberlin, 1949) — Alaska
 Satilatlas monticola Millidge, 1981 — USA

Sauron
Sauron Eskov, 1995
 Sauron fissocornis Eskov, 1995 — Russia, Kazakhstan
 Sauron rayi (Simon, 1881) — Europe

Savignia
Savignia Blackwall, 1833
 Savignia amurensis Eskov, 1991 — Russia
 Savignia badzhalensis Eskov, 1991 — Russia
 Savignia basarukini Eskov, 1988 — Russia
 Savignia birostra (Chamberlin & Ivie, 1947) — Russia, China, Alaska
 Savignia borea Eskov, 1988 — Russia
 Savignia bureensis Tanasevitch & Trilikauskas, 2006 — Russia
 Savignia centrasiatica Eskov, 1991 — Russia
 Savignia erythrocephala (Simon, 1908) — Western Australia
 Savignia eskovi Marusik, Koponen & Danilov, 2001 — Russia
 Savignia frontata Blackwall, 1833 — Palearctic
 Savignia fronticornis (Simon, 1884) — Mediterranean
 Savignia harmsi Wunderlich, 1980 — Spain
 Savignia kartalensis Jocque, 1985 — Comoro Islands
 Savignia kawachiensis Oi, 1960 — Japan
 Savignia naniplopi Bosselaers & Henderickx, 2002 — Crete
 Savignia producta Holm, 1977 — Palearctic
 Savignia pseudofrontata Paik, 1978 — Korea
 Savignia rostellatra Song & Li, 2009 — China
 Savignia saitoi Eskov, 1988 — Russia
 Savignia superstes Thaler, 1984 — France
 Savignia ussurica Eskov, 1988 — Russia
 Savignia yasudai (Saito, 1986) — Japan
 Savignia zero Eskov, 1988 — Russia

Savigniorrhipis
Savigniorrhipis Wunderlich, 1992
 Savigniorrhipis acoreensis Wunderlich, 1992 — Azores
 Savigniorrhipis topographicus Crespo, 2013 — Azores

Scandichrestus
Scandichrestus Wunderlich, 1995
 Scandichrestus tenuis (Holm, 1943) — Sweden, Finland, Russia

Schistogyna
Schistogyna Millidge, 1991
 Schistogyna arcana Millidge, 1991 — Juan Fernandez Islands

Sciastes
Sciastes Bishop & Crosby, 1938
 Sciastes carli (Lessert, 1907) — France, Italy, Switzerland, Austria
 Sciastes dubius (Hackman, 1954) — Russia, Canada, USA
 Sciastes extremus Holm, 1967 — Canada, Greenland
 Sciastes hastatus Millidge, 1984 — USA, Canada
 Sciastes mentasta (Chamberlin & Ivie, 1947) — Canada, Alaska
 Sciastes tenna Chamberlin, 1949 — USA
 Sciastes truncatus (Emerton, 1882) — USA, Canada, Alaska

Scirites
Scirites Bishop & Crosby, 1938
 Scirites finitimus Duperre & Paquin, 2007 — USA, Canada
 Scirites pectinatus (Emerton, 1911) — USA, Canada

Scironis
Scironis Bishop & Crosby, 1938
 Scironis sima Chamberlin, 1949 — USA
 Scironis tarsalis (Emerton, 1911) — USA

Scolecura
Scolecura Millidge, 1991
 Scolecura cambara Rodrigues, 2005 — Brazil
 Scolecura cognata Millidge, 1991 — Colombia
 Scolecura parilis Millidge, 1991 — Brazil, Argentina
 Scolecura propinqua Millidge, 1991 — Argentina

Scolopembolus
Scolopembolus Bishop & Crosby, 1938
 Scolopembolus littoralis (Emerton, 1913) — USA

Scotargus
Scotargus Simon, 1913
 Scotargus enghoffi Wunderlich, 1992 — Canary Islands
 Scotargus grancanariensis Wunderlich, 1992 — Canary Islands
 Scotargus numidicus Bosmans, 2006 — Algeria
 Scotargus pilosus Simon, 1913 — Palearctic
 Scotargus secundus Wunderlich, 1987 — Canary Islands
 Scotargus tenerifensis Wunderlich, 1992 — Canary Islands

Scotinotylus
Scotinotylus Simon, 1884
 Scotinotylus alienus (Kulczynski, 1885) — Russia, Alaska, Canada
 Scotinotylus allocotus Crawford & Edwards, 1989 — USA
 Scotinotylus alpigena (L. Koch, 1869) — Palearctic
 Scotinotylus alpinus (Banks, 1896) — Russia, Mongolia, Alaska, Canada, USA, Greenland
 Scotinotylus altaicus Marusik, Hippa & Koponen, 1996 — Russia
 Scotinotylus ambiguus Millidge, 1981 — USA, Canada
 Scotinotylus amurensis Eskov & Marusik, 1994 — Russia
 Scotinotylus antennatus (O. P.-Cambridge, 1875) — Europe. Russia, Kazakhstan
 Scotinotylus apache (Chamberlin, 1949) — USA
 Scotinotylus autor (Chamberlin, 1949) — USA
 Scotinotylus bicavatus Millidge, 1981 — USA
 Scotinotylus bodenburgi (Chamberlin & Ivie, 1947) — Alaska
 Scotinotylus boreus Millidge, 1981 — Canada
 Scotinotylus castoris (Chamberlin, 1949) — USA
 Scotinotylus clavatus (Schenkel, 1927) — Switzerland, Austria
 Scotinotylus columbia (Chamberlin, 1949) — Canada
 Scotinotylus crinitis Millidge, 1981 — USA
 Scotinotylus dubiosus Millidge, 1981 — USA
 Scotinotylus eutypus (Chamberlin, 1949) — Holarctic
 Scotinotylus evansi (O. P.-Cambridge, 1894) — Greenland, Palearctic
 Scotinotylus exsectoides Millidge, 1981 — Canada
 Scotinotylus formicarius (Dondale & Redner, 1972) — USA
 Scotinotylus gracilis Millidge, 1981 — USA
 Scotinotylus humilis Millidge, 1981 — USA
 Scotinotylus kenus (Chamberlin, 1949) — USA
 Scotinotylus kimjoopili Eskov & Marusik, 1994 — Russia
 Scotinotylus kolymensis Eskov & Marusik, 1994 — Russia
 Scotinotylus levii Marusik, 1988 — Russia
 Scotinotylus majesticus (Chamberlin & Ivie, 1947) — Alaska, Canada, USA
 Scotinotylus millidgei Eskov, 1989 — Russia
 Scotinotylus montanus Millidge, 1981 — USA
 Scotinotylus pallidus (Emerton, 1882) — USA, Canada
 Scotinotylus patellatus (Emerton, 1917) — Alaska, Canada, USA
 Scotinotylus pollucis Millidge, 1981 — USA
 Scotinotylus protervus (L. Koch, 1879) — Russia, Kazakhstan, Mongolia, Alaska, Canada
 Scotinotylus provincialis Denis, 1949 — France
 Scotinotylus provo (Chamberlin, 1949) — USA
 Scotinotylus regalis Millidge, 1981 — USA
 Scotinotylus sacer (Crosby, 1929) — Holarctic
 Scotinotylus sacratus Millidge, 1981 — USA
 Scotinotylus sagittatus Millidge, 1981 — USA
 Scotinotylus sanctus (Crosby, 1929) — USA, Canada
 Scotinotylus sintalutus Millidge, 1981 — Canada
 Scotinotylus tianschanicus Tanasevitch, 1989 — Central Asia
 Scotinotylus venetus (Thorell, 1875) — Italy
 Scotinotylus vernalis (Emerton, 1882) — USA, Canada
 Scotinotylus vettonicus Barrientos & Hernández-Corral, 2020 — Spain, France

Scutpelecopsis
Scutpelecopsis Marusik & Gnelitsa, 2009
 Scutpelecopsis krausi (Wunderlich, 1980) — Balkans, Greece to Armenia
 Scutpelecopsis loricata Duma & Tanasevitch, 2011 — Romania
 Scutpelecopsis media Wunderlich, 2011 — Turkey
 Scutpelecopsis procer Wunderlich, 2011 — Iran
 Scutpelecopsis wunderlichi Marusik & Gnelitsa, 2009 — Abkhazia

Scylaceus
Scylaceus Bishop & Crosby, 1938
 Scylaceus pallidus (Emerton, 1882) — USA, Canada
 Scylaceus selma (Chamberlin, 1949) — USA

Scyletria
Scyletria Bishop & Crosby, 1938
 Scyletria inflata Bishop & Crosby, 1938 — USA, Canada

Selenyphantes
Selenyphantes Gertsch & Davis, 1946
 Selenyphantes longispinosus (O. P.-Cambridge, 1896) — Mexico, Guatemala

Semljicola
Semljicola Strand, 1906
 Semljicola alticola (Holm, 1950) — Sweden, Finland, Russia
 Semljicola angulatus (Holm, 1963) — Scandinavia, Russia, Mongolia, Sakhalin
 Semljicola arcticus (Eskov, 1989) — Russia
 Semljicola barbiger (L. Koch, 1879) — Sweden, Finland, Russia, Kazakhstan
 Semljicola beringianus (Eskov, 1989) — Russia
 Semljicola caliginosus (Falconer, 1910) — England, Scotland, Russia
 Semljicola convexus (Holm, 1963) — Russia, Alaska, Canada
 Semljicola faustus (O. P.-Cambridge, 1900) — Palearctic
 Semljicola lapponicus (Holm, 1939) — Scandinavia, Russia, Alaska
 Semljicola latus (Holm, 1939) — Scandinavia, Russia, Mongolia
 Semljicola obtusus (Emerton, 1915) — USA, Canada, Greenland
 Semljicola qixiensis (Gao, Zhu & Fei, 1993) — China
 Semljicola simplex (Kulczynski, 1908) — Russia
 Semljicola thaleri (Eskov, 1981) — Russia, Kazakhstan

Sengletus
Sengletus Tanasevitch, 2008
 Sengletus extricatus (O. P.-Cambridge, 1876) — Egypt, Israel, Iran
 Sengletus latus Tanasevitch, 2009 — Iran

Shaanxinus
Shaanxinus Tanasevitch, 2006
 Shaanxinus anguilliformis (Xia et al., 2001) — China
 Shaanxinus atayal (Lin, 2019) — Taiwan
 Shaanxinus curviductus (Lin, 2019) — Taiwan
 Shaanxinus hehuanensis (Lin, 2019) — Taiwan
 Shaanxinus hirticephalus (Lin, 2019) — Taiwan
 Shaanxinus lixiangae (Lin, 2019) — Taiwan
 Shaanxinus magnaclypeus (Lin, 2019) — Taiwan
 Shaanxinus makauyensis (Lin, 2019) — Taiwan
 Shaanxinus meifengensis (Lin, 2019) — Taiwan
 Shaanxinus mingchihensis (Lin, 2019) — Taiwan
 Shaanxinus rufus Tanasevitch, 2006 — China
 Shaanxinus seediq (Lin, 2019) — Taiwan
 Shaanxinus shihchoensis (Lin, 2019) — Taiwan
 Shaanxinus shoukaensis (Lin, 2019) — Taiwan
 Shaanxinus tamdaoensis (Lin, 2019) — Vietnam
 Shaanxinus tsou (Lin, 2019) — Taiwan

Shanus
Shanus Tanasevitch, 2006
 Shanus taibaiensis Tanasevitch, 2006 — China

Sibirocyba
Sibirocyba Eskov & Marusik, 1994
 Sibirocyba incerta (Kulczynski, 1916) — Russia

Silometopoides
Silometopoides Eskov, 1990
Silometopoides asiaticus (Eskov, 1995) – Kazakhstan
Silometopoides koponeni (Eskov & Marusik, 1994) – Russia
Silometopoides mongolensis Eskov & Marusik, 1992 – Russia, Mongolia
Silometopoides pampia (Chamberlin, 1949)T – Russia, Canada, Greenland
Silometopoides pingrensis (Crosby & Bishop, 1933) – USA
Silometopoides sibiricus (Eskov, 1989) – Russia
Silometopoides sphagnicola Eskov & Marusik, 1992 – Russia
Silometopoides tibialis (Heimer, 1987) – Russia, Mongolia
Silometopoides yodoensis (Oi, 1960) – Russia, China, Korea, Japan

Silometopus
Silometopus Simon, 1926
 Silometopus acutus Holm, 1977 — Sweden, Poland, Russia
 Silometopus ambiguus (O. P.-Cambridge, 1905) — Europe
 Silometopus bonessi Casemir, 1970 — Belgium, Switzerland, Austria, Germany, Slovakia
 Silometopus braunianus Thaler, 1978 — Switzerland, Italy
 Silometopus crassipedis Tanasevitch & Piterkina, 2007 — Russia, Kazakhstan
 Silometopus curtus (Simon, 1881) — Europe
 Silometopus elegans (O. P.-Cambridge, 1872) — Palearctic
 Silometopus incurvatus (O. P.-Cambridge, 1873) — Palearctic
 Silometopus minutus (Tanasevitch, 2016) — Israel
 Silometopus nitidithorax (Simon, 1914) — France, Greece
 Silometopus pectinatus (Tanasevitch, 2016) — Israel
 Silometopus reussi (Thorell, 1871) — Palearctic
 Silometopus rosemariae Wunderlich, 1969 — Germany, Switzerland, Austria, Italy
 Silometopus sachalinensis (Eskov & Marusik, 1994) — Russia, Japan
 Silometopus tenuispinus Denis, 1949 — France, Andorra
 Silometopus uralensis Tanasevitch, 1985 — Russia

Simplicistilus
Simplicistilus Locket, 1968
 Simplicistilus tanuekes Locket, 1968 — West, Central Africa

Singatrichona
Singatrichona Tanasevitch, 2019
 Singatrichona longipes Tanasevitch, 2019 — Singapore

Sinolinyphia
Sinolinyphia Wunderlich & Li, 1995
 Sinolinyphia henanensis (Hu, Wang & Wang, 1991) — China

Sintula
Sintula Simon, 1884
 Sintula corniger (Blackwall, 1856) — Europe to Azerbaijan
 Sintula cretaensis Wunderlich, 1995 — Crete
 Sintula criodes (Thorell, 1875) — Ukraine
 Sintula cristatus Wunderlich, 1995 — Turkey
 Sintula diceros Simon, 1926 — France
 Sintula furcifer (Simon, 1911) — Portugal, Spain, Morocco, Algeria
 Sintula iberica Bosmans, 2010 — Portugal
 Sintula orientalis Bosmans, 1991 — Algeria
 Sintula oseticus Tanasevitch, 1990 — Russia
 Sintula pecten Wunderlich, 2011 — Canary Islands
 Sintula penicilliger (Simon, 1884) — Algeria
 Sintula pseudocorniger Bosmans, 1991 — Algeria, Tunisia
 Sintula retroversus (O. P.-Cambridge, 1875) — Europe to Azerbaijan
 Sintula roeweri Kratochvil, 1935 — Montenegro
 Sintula solitarius Gnelitsa, 2012 — Ukraine
 Sintula spiniger (Balogh, 1935) — Austria to Russia, Ukraine
 Sintula subterminalis Bosmans, 1991 — Algeria

Sisicottus
Sisicottus Bishop & Crosby, 1938
 Sisicottus aenigmaticus Miller, 1999 — USA
 Sisicottus crossoclavis Miller, 1999 — USA, Canada
 Sisicottus cynthiae Miller, 1999 — USA
 Sisicottus montanus (Emerton, 1882) — USA, Canada
 Sisicottus montigenus Bishop & Crosby, 1938 — USA
 Sisicottus nesides (Chamberlin, 1921) — USA, Canada, Alaska
 Sisicottus orites (Chamberlin, 1919) — USA, Canada
 Sisicottus panopeus Miller, 1999 — USA, Canada, Kurile Islands
 Sisicottus quoylei Miller, 1999 — USA, Canada

Sisicus
Sisicus Bishop & Crosby, 1938
 Sisicus apertus (Holm, 1939) — Holarctic
 Sisicus penifusifer Bishop & Crosby, 1938 — USA, Canada
 Sisicus volutasilex Duperre & Paquin, 2007 — Canada

Sisis
Sisis Bishop & Crosby, 1938
 Sisis plesius (Chamberlin, 1949) — USA
 Sisis rotundus (Emerton, 1925) — USA, Canada

Sisyrbe
Sisyrbe Bishop & Crosby, 1938
 Sisyrbe rustica (Banks, 1892) — USA

Sitalcas
Sitalcas Bishop & Crosby, 1938
 Sitalcas ruralis Bishop & Crosby, 1938 — USA

Smerasia
Smerasia Zhao & Li, 2014
 Smerasia obscurus Zhao & Li, 2014 — China

Smermisia
Smermisia Simon, 1894
 Smermisia caracasana Simon, 1894 — Venezuela
 Smermisia esperanzae (Tullgren, 1901) — Chile
 Smermisia holdridgi Miller, 2007 — Costa Rica
 Smermisia parvoris Miller, 2007 — Brazil, Argentina
 Smermisia vicosana (Bishop & Crosby, 1938) — Brazil, Argentina

Smodix
Smodix Bishop & Crosby, 1938
 Smodix reticulata (Emerton, 1915) — USA, Canada

Solenysa
Solenysa Simon, 1894
 Solenysa geumoensis Seo, 1996 — Korea
 Solenysa lanyuensis Tu, 2011 — Taiwan
 Solenysa longqiensis Li & Song, 1992 — China, Taiwan
 Solenysa macrodonta Wang, Ono & Tu, 2015 — Japan
 Solenysa mellotteei Simon, 1894 — Japan
 Solenysa ogatai Ono, 2011 — Japan
 Solenysa partibilis Tu, Ono & Li, 2007 — Japan
 Solenysa protrudens Gao, Zhu & Sha, 1993 — China
 Solenysa reflexilis Tu, Ono & Li, 2007 — Japan
 Solenysa retractilis Tu, 2011 — China
 Solenysa spiralis Tian & Tu, 2018 — China
 Solenysa tianmushana Tu, 2011 — China
 Solenysa trunciformis Wang, Ono & Tu, 2015 — Japan
 Solenysa wulingensis Li & Song, 1992 — China
 Solenysa yangmingshana Tu, 2011 — Taiwan

Soucron
Soucron Crosby & Bishop, 1936
 Soucron arenarium (Emerton, 1925) — USA, Canada

Souessa
Souessa Crosby & Bishop, 1936
 Souessa spinifera (O. P.-Cambridge, 1874) — USA

Souessoula
Souessoula Crosby & Bishop, 1936
 Souessoula parva (Banks, 1899) — USA

Sougambus
Sougambus Crosby & Bishop, 1936
 Sougambus bostoniensis (Emerton, 1882) — USA, Canada

Souidas
Souidas Crosby & Bishop, 1936
 Souidas tibialis (Emerton, 1882) — USA

Soulgas
Soulgas Crosby & Bishop, 1936
 Soulgas corticarius (Emerton, 1909) — USA

Spanioplanus
Spanioplanus Millidge, 1991
 Spanioplanus mitis Millidge, 1991 — Venezuela, Peru

Sphecozone
Sphecozone O. P.-Cambridge, 1870
 Sphecozone altehabitans (Keyserling, 1886) — Peru
 Sphecozone alticeps Millidge, 1991 — Colombia
 Sphecozone araeonciformis (Simon, 1895) — Argentina
 Sphecozone bicolor (Nicolet, 1849) — Chile, Argentina
 Sphecozone capitata Millidge, 1991 — Peru
 Sphecozone castanea (Millidge, 1991) — Brazil
 Sphecozone corniculans Millidge, 1991 — Colombia
 Sphecozone cornuta Millidge, 1991 — Argentina
 Sphecozone crassa (Millidge, 1991) — Colombia, Brazil
 Sphecozone crinita Millidge, 1991 — Ecuador
 Sphecozone diversicolor (Keyserling, 1886) — Brazil, Argentina
 Sphecozone fastibilis (Keyserling, 1886) — Brazil, Argentina
 Sphecozone formosa (Millidge, 1991) — Ecuador
 Sphecozone gravis (Millidge, 1991) — Bolivia
 Sphecozone ignigena (Keyserling, 1886) — Brazil, Argentina
 Sphecozone labiata (Keyserling, 1886) — Brazil
 Sphecozone lobata Millidge, 1991 — Juan Fernandez Islands
 Sphecozone longipes (Strand, 1908) — Peru
 Sphecozone magnipalpis Millidge, 1993 — USA
 Sphecozone melanocephala (Millidge, 1991) — Brazil
 Sphecozone modesta (Nicolet, 1849) — Bolivia, Brazil, Chile, Argentina
 Sphecozone modica Millidge, 1991 — Argentina
 Sphecozone nigripes Millidge, 1991 — Peru
 Sphecozone nitens Millidge, 1991 — Ecuador, Peru
 Sphecozone niwina (Chamberlin, 1916) — Peru, Bolivia, Chile
 Sphecozone novaeteutoniae (Baert, 1987) — Brazil
 Sphecozone personata (Simon, 1894) — Brazil
 Sphecozone rostrata Millidge, 1991 — Brazil
 Sphecozone rubescens O. P.-Cambridge, 1870 — Brazil, Paraguay, Argentina
 Sphecozone rubicunda (Keyserling, 1886) — Peru
 Sphecozone spadicaria (Simon, 1894) — Colombia, Trinidad, Venezuela
 Sphecozone tumidosa (Keyserling, 1886) — Brazil, Argentina
 Sphecozone varia Millidge, 1991 — Peru
 Sphecozone venialis (Keyserling, 1886) — Brazil, Argentina

Spiralophantes
Spiralophantes Tanasevitch & Saaristo, 2006
 Spiralophantes mirabilis Tanasevitch & Saaristo, 2006 — Nepal

Spirembolus
Spirembolus Chamberlin, 1920
 Spirembolus abnormis Millidge, 1980 — USA, Canada
 Spirembolus approximatus (Chamberlin, 1949) — USA
 Spirembolus bilobatus (Chamberlin & Ivie, 1945) — USA
 Spirembolus cheronus Chamberlin, 1949 — USA
 Spirembolus chilkatensis (Chamberlin & Ivie, 1947) — USA, Alaska
 Spirembolus demonologicus (Crosby, 1925) — USA
 Spirembolus dispar Millidge, 1980 — USA
 Spirembolus elevatus Millidge, 1980 — USA
 Spirembolus erratus Millidge, 1980 — USA
 Spirembolus falcatus Millidge, 1980 — USA
 Spirembolus fasciatus (Banks, 1904) — USA
 Spirembolus fuscus Millidge, 1980 — USA
 Spirembolus hibernus Millidge, 1980 — USA
 Spirembolus humilis Millidge, 1980 — USA
 Spirembolus latebricola Millidge, 1980 — USA
 Spirembolus levis Millidge, 1980 — USA, Mexico
 Spirembolus maderus Chamberlin, 1949 — USA
 Spirembolus mendax Millidge, 1980 — USA
 Spirembolus mirus Millidge, 1980 — USA
 Spirembolus monicus (Chamberlin, 1949) — USA
 Spirembolus monticolens (Chamberlin, 1919) — USA, Canada
 Spirembolus montivagus Millidge, 1980 — USA
 Spirembolus mundus Chamberlin & Ivie, 1933 — USA, Canada
 Spirembolus novellus Millidge, 1980 — USA
 Spirembolus oreinoides Chamberlin, 1949 — USA, Canada
 Spirembolus pachygnathus Chamberlin & Ivie, 1935 — USA
 Spirembolus pallidus Chamberlin & Ivie, 1935 — USA
 Spirembolus perjucundus Crosby, 1925 — USA
 Spirembolus phylax Chamberlin & Ivie, 1935 — USA
 Spirembolus praelongus Millidge, 1980 — USA
 Spirembolus prominens Millidge, 1980 — USA, Canada
 Spirembolus proximus Millidge, 1980 — USA
 Spirembolus pusillus Millidge, 1980 — USA
 Spirembolus redondo (Chamberlin & Ivie, 1945) — USA
 Spirembolus spirotubus (Banks, 1895) — USA, Canada
 Spirembolus synopticus Crosby, 1925 — USA
 Spirembolus tiogensis Millidge, 1980 — USA
 Spirembolus tortuosus (Crosby, 1925) — USA
 Spirembolus vallicolens Chamberlin, 1920 — USA
 Spirembolus venustus Millidge, 1980 — USA
 Spirembolus whitneyanus Chamberlin & Ivie, 1935 — USA

Stemonyphantes
Stemonyphantes Menge, 1866
 Stemonyphantes abantensis Wunderlich, 1978 — Turkey
 Stemonyphantes agnatus Tanasevitch, 1990 — Russia, Georgia, Azerbaijan
 Stemonyphantes altaicus Tanasevitch, 2000 — Russia, Kazakhstan
 Stemonyphantes blauveltae Gertsch, 1951 — USA, Canada
 Stemonyphantes conspersus (L. Koch, 1879) — Central Europe to Kazakhstan
 Stemonyphantes curvipes Tanasevitch, 1989 — Kyrgyzstan
 Stemonyphantes griseus (Schenkel, 1936) — Kyrgyzstan, China
 Stemonyphantes grossus Tanasevitch, 1985 — Kyrgyzstan
 Stemonyphantes karatau Tanasevitch & Esyunin, 2012 — Kazakhstan
 Stemonyphantes lineatus (Linnaeus, 1758) — Palearctic
 Stemonyphantes menyuanensis Hu, 2001 — China
 Stemonyphantes montanus Wunderlich, 1978 — Turkey
 Stemonyphantes parvipalpus Tanasevitch, 2007 — Russia
 Stemonyphantes serratus Tanasevitch, 2011 — Turkey
 Stemonyphantes sibiricus (Grube, 1861) — Russia, Kazakhstan, Mongolia, Kurile Islands
 Stemonyphantes solitudus Tanasevitch, 1994 — Turkmenistan
 Stemonyphantes taiganoides Tanasevitch, Esyunin & Stepina, 2012 — Russia, Kazakhstan
 Stemonyphantes taiganus (Ermolajev, 1930) — Russia

Sthelota
Sthelota Simon, 1894
 Sthelota albonotata (Keyserling, 1886) — Panama
 Sthelota sana (O. P.-Cambridge, 1898) — Guatemala

Stictonanus
Stictonanus Millidge, 1991
 Stictonanus exiguus Millidge, 1991 — Chile
 Stictonanus paucus Millidge, 1991 — Chile

Strandella
Strandella Oi, 1960
 Strandella fluctimaculata Saito, 1982 — Russia, Japan
 Strandella paranglampara Barrion, Barrion-Dupo & Heong, 2013 — China
 Strandella pargongensis (Paik, 1965) — Russia, China, Korea, Japan
 Strandella quadrimaculata (Uyemura, 1937) — Japan
 Strandella yaginumai Saito, 1982 — Japan

Strongyliceps
Strongyliceps Fage, in Fage & Simon, 1936
 Strongyliceps alluaudi Fage, 1936 — Kenya
 Strongyliceps anderseni Holm, 1962 — Kenya, Uganda

Styloctetor
Styloctetor Simon, 1884
 Styloctetor austerus (L. Koch, 1884) — Switzerland, Austria
 Styloctetor compar (Breitling et al., 2015) — Alaska, Canada, Europe, Russia, Kazakhstan
 Styloctetor lehtineni Marusik & Tanasevitch, 1998 — Russia
 Styloctetor logunovi (Eskov & Marusik, 1994) — Russia, Kazakhstan, Mongolia
 Styloctetor okhotensis (Eskov, 1993) — Russia
 Styloctetor purpurescens (Keyserling, 1886) — USA, Canada
 Styloctetor romanus (O. P.-Cambridge, 1872) — Palearctic
 Styloctetor tuvinensis Marusik & Tanasevitch, 1998 — Russia

Subbekasha
Subbekasha Millidge, 1984
 Subbekasha flabellifera Millidge, 1984 — Canada

Syedra
Syedra Simon, 1884
 Syedra apetlonensis Wunderlich, 1992 — Austria, Slovakia, Russia
 Syedra gracilis (Menge, 1869) — Palearctic
 Syedra myrmicarum (Kulczynski, 1882) — Central Europe
 Syedra nigrotibialis Simon, 1884 — Corsica
 Syedra oii Saito, 1983 — China, Korea, Japan
 Syedra parvula Kritscher, 1996 — Malta
 Syedra scamba (Locket, 1968) — Congo

Symmigma
Symmigma Crosby & Bishop, 1933
 Symmigma minimum (Emerton, 1923) — USA

Tachygyna
Tachygyna Chamberlin & Ivie, 1939
 Tachygyna alia Millidge, 1984 — USA
 Tachygyna cognata Millidge, 1984 — USA
 Tachygyna coosi Millidge, 1984 — USA
 Tachygyna delecta Chamberlin & Ivie, 1939 — USA
 Tachygyna exilis Millidge, 1984 — USA, Canada
 Tachygyna gargopa (Crosby & Bishop, 1929) — USA
 Tachygyna haydeni Chamberlin & Ivie, 1939 — USA, Canada
 Tachygyna pallida Chamberlin & Ivie, 1939 — USA, Canada
 Tachygyna proba Millidge, 1984 — USA, Canada
 Tachygyna sonoma Millidge, 1984 — USA
 Tachygyna speciosa Millidge, 1984 — USA
 Tachygyna tuoba (Chamberlin & Ivie, 1933) — USA
 Tachygyna ursina (Bishop & Crosby, 1938) — USA, Canada, Alaska
 Tachygyna vancouverana Chamberlin & Ivie, 1939 — USA, Canada
 Tachygyna watona Chamberlin, 1949 — USA

Taibainus
Taibainus Tanasevitch, 2006
 Taibainus shanensis Tanasevitch, 2006 — China

Taibaishanus
Taibaishanus Tanasevitch, 2006
 Taibaishanus elegans Tanasevitch, 2006 — China

Tallusia
Tallusia Lehtinen & Saaristo, 1972
 Tallusia bicristata Lehtinen & Saaristo, 1972 — Turkey
 Tallusia experta (O. P.-Cambridge, 1871) — Palearctic
 Tallusia forficala (Zhu & Tu, 1986) — China
 Tallusia pindos Thaler, 1997 — Greece
 Tallusia vindobonensis (Kulczynski, 1898) — Central, Eastern Europe

Tanasevitchia
Tanasevitchia Marusik & Saaristo, 1999
 Tanasevitchia strandi (Ermolajev, 1937) — Russia
 Tanasevitchia uralensis (Tanasevitch, 1983) — Russia

Tapinocyba
Tapinocyba Simon, 1884
 Tapinocyba abetoneensis Wunderlich, 1980 — Italy
 Tapinocyba affinis Lessert, 1907 — Palearctic
 Tapinocyba affinis orientalis Millidge, 1979 — Central Europe
 Tapinocyba affinis pyrenaea Millidge, 1979 — France
 Tapinocyba algirica Bosmans, 2007 — Portugal, Algeria
 Tapinocyba altimontana Tanasevitch, 2019 — Nepal
 Tapinocyba anceps Denis, 1948 — France
 Tapinocyba bicarinata (Emerton, 1913) — USA
 Tapinocyba biscissa (O. P.-Cambridge, 1872) — Palearctic
 Tapinocyba cameroni Duperre & Paquin, 2007 — Canada
 Tapinocyba corsica (Simon, 1884) — Corsica
 Tapinocyba dietrichi Crosby & Bishop, 1933 — USA
 Tapinocyba discedens Denis, 1948 — France
 Tapinocyba distincta (Banks, 1892) — USA
 Tapinocyba emei Tanasevitch, 2018 — China
 Tapinocyba emertoni Barrows & Ivie, 1942 — USA
 Tapinocyba formosa Tanasevitch, 2011 — Taiwan
 Tapinocyba gamma Chamberlin, 1949 — USA
 Tapinocyba hortensis (Emerton, 1924) — USA
 Tapinocyba insecta (L. Koch, 1869) — Palearctic
 Tapinocyba kolymensis Eskov, 1989 — Russia, China
 Tapinocyba latia Millidge, 1979 — Italy
 Tapinocyba ligurica Thaler, 1976 — Italy, France
 Tapinocyba lindrothi Hackman, 1954 — Canada
 Tapinocyba lucana Millidge, 1979 — Italy
 Tapinocyba maureri Thaler, 1991 — Switzerland, Italy
 Tapinocyba minuta (Emerton, 1909) — USA, Canada
 Tapinocyba mitis (O. P.-Cambridge, 1882) — Britain, Spain, France, Latvia
 Tapinocyba montivaga Tanasevitch, 2019 — Nepal
 Tapinocyba pallens (O. P.-Cambridge, 1872) — Europe to Armenia
 Tapinocyba pontis Chamberlin, 1949 — USA
 Tapinocyba praecox (O. P.-Cambridge, 1873) — Europe
 Tapinocyba prima Duperre & Paquin, 2005 — USA, Canada
 Tapinocyba silvicultrix Saito, 1980 — Japan
 Tapinocyba simplex (Emerton, 1882) — USA
 Tapinocyba spoliatrix Tanasevitch, 1985 — Kyrgyzstan
 Tapinocyba sucra Chamberlin, 1949 — USA
 Tapinocyba suganamii Saito & Ono, 2001 — Japan
 Tapinocyba ventosa Millidge, 1979 — France
 Tapinocyba vermontis Chamberlin, 1949 — USA

Tapinocyboides
Tapinocyboides Wiehle, 1960
 Tapinocyboides bengalensis Tanasevitch, 2011 — India
 Tapinocyboides pygmaeus (Menge, 1869) — Palearctic

Tapinopa
Tapinopa Westring, 1851
 Tapinopa bilineata Banks, 1893 — USA
 Tapinopa disjugata Simon, 1884 — Palearctic
 Tapinopa gerede Saaristo, 1997 — Turkey
 Tapinopa guttata Komatsu, 1937 — Russia, China, Japan
 Tapinopa hentzi Gertsch, 1951 — USA
 Tapinopa longidens (Wider, 1834) — Palearctic
 Tapinopa undata Zhao & Li, 2014 — China
 Tapinopa vara Locket, 1982 — Malaysia

Tapinotorquis
Tapinotorquis Duperre & Paquin, 2007
 Tapinotorquis yamaskensis Duperre & Paquin, 2007 — USA, Canada

Taranucnus
Taranucnus Simon, 1884
 Taranucnus beskidicus Hirna, 2018 — Ukraine
 Taranucnus bihari Fage, 1931 — Eastern Europe
 Taranucnus carpaticus Gnelitsa, 2016 — Ukraine
 Taranucnus nishikii Yaginuma, 1972 — Japan
 Taranucnus ornithes (Barrows, 1940) — USA
 Taranucnus setosus (O. P.-Cambridge, 1863) — Palearctic

Tarsiphantes
Tarsiphantes Strand, 1905
 Tarsiphantes latithorax Strand, 1905 — Russia, Canada, Greenland

Tchatkalophantes
Tchatkalophantes Tanasevitch, 2001
 Tchatkalophantes baltistan Tanasevitch, 2011 — Pakistan
 Tchatkalophantes bonneti (Schenkel, 1963) — China
 Tchatkalophantes huangyuanensis (Zhu & Li, 1983) — China
 Tchatkalophantes hyperauritus (Loksa, 1965) — Mongolia
 Tchatkalophantes karatau Tanasevitch, 2001 — Kazakhstan
 Tchatkalophantes kungei Tanasevitch, 2001 — Kyrgyzstan
 Tchatkalophantes mongolicus Tanasevitch, 2001 — Mongolia
 Tchatkalophantes rupeus (Tanasevitch, 1986) — Kazakhstan
 Tchatkalophantes tarabaevi Tanasevitch, 2001 — Kazakhstan
 Tchatkalophantes tchatkalensis (Tanasevitch, 1983) — Central Asia

Tegulinus
Tegulinus Tanasevitch, 2017
 Tegulinus bifurcatus Tanasevitch, 2017 — Sumatra
 Tegulinus sumatranus Tanasevitch, 2017 — Sumatra

Tennesseellum
Tennesseellum Petrunkevitch, 1925
 Tennesseellum formica (Emerton, 1882) — North America, Marshall Islands
 Tennesseellum gollum Duperre, 2013 — USA

Tenuiphantes
Tenuiphantes Saaristo & Tanasevitch, 1996
 Tenuiphantes aduncus (Zhu, Li & Sha, 1986) — China
 Tenuiphantes aequalis (Tanasevitch, 1987) — Turkey, Russia, Armenia
 Tenuiphantes alacris (Blackwall, 1853) — Palearctic
 Tenuiphantes altimontanus Tanasevitch & Saaristo, 2006 — Nepal
 Tenuiphantes ancatus (Li & Zhu, 1989) — China
 Tenuiphantes ateripes (Tanasevitch, 1988) — Russia
 Tenuiphantes canariensis (Wunderlich, 1987) — Canary Islands
 Tenuiphantes cantabropyrenaeus Bosmans, 2016 — Spain, France
 Tenuiphantes contortus (Tanasevitch, 1986) — Russia, Georgia, Azerbaijan, Armenia
 Tenuiphantes cracens (Zorsch, 1937) — North America
 Tenuiphantes crassus Tanasevitch & Saaristo, 2006 — Nepal
 Tenuiphantes cristatus (Menge, 1866) — Palearctic
 Tenuiphantes drenskyi (van Helsdingen, 1977) — Bulgaria
 Tenuiphantes flavipes (Blackwall, 1854) — Palearctic
 Tenuiphantes floriana (van Helsdingen, 1977) — Romania
 Tenuiphantes fogarasensis (Weiss, 1986) — Romania
 Tenuiphantes fulvus (Wunderlich, 1987) — Canary Islands
 Tenuiphantes herbicola (Simon, 1884) — France, Corsica, Italy, Algeria
 Tenuiphantes jacksoni (Schenkel, 1925) — Switzerland, Austria, Turkey
 Tenuiphantes jacksonoides (van Helsdingen, 1977) — Switzerland, Germany, Austria
 Tenuiphantes lagonaki Tanasevitch, Ponomarev & Chumachenko, 2016 — Russia (Caucasus)
 Tenuiphantes leprosoides (Schmidt, 1975) — Canary Islands
 Tenuiphantes mengei (Kulczynski, 1887) — Palearctic
 Tenuiphantes miguelensis (Wunderlich, 1992) — Azores, Madeira
 Tenuiphantes monachus (Simon, 1884) — Europe
 Tenuiphantes morosus (Tanasevitch, 1987) — Russia, Georgia, Azerbaijan
 Tenuiphantes nigriventris (L. Koch, 1879) — Holarctic
 Tenuiphantes perseus (van Helsdingen, 1977) — Russia, Central Asia, Iran
 Tenuiphantes plumipes (Tanasevitch, 1987) — Nepal
 Tenuiphantes retezaticus (Ruzicka, 1985) — Romania
 Tenuiphantes sabulosus (Keyserling, 1886) — North America
 Tenuiphantes spiniger (Simon, 1929) — France
 Tenuiphantes stramencola (Scharff, 1990) — Tanzania
 Tenuiphantes striatiscapus (Wunderlich, 1987) — Canary Islands
 Tenuiphantes suborientalis Tanasevitch, 2000 — Russia
 Tenuiphantes teberdaensis Tanasevitch, 2010 — Russia
 Tenuiphantes tenebricola (Wider, 1834) — Palearctic
 Tenuiphantes tenebricoloides (Schenkel, 1938) — Madeira
 Tenuiphantes tenuis (Blackwall, 1852) — Palearctic (elsewhere, introduced)
 Tenuiphantes wunderlichi (Saaristo & Tanasevitch, 1996) — Turkey
 Tenuiphantes zebra (Emerton, 1882) — North America
 Tenuiphantes zelatus (Zorsch, 1937) — North America
 Tenuiphantes zibus (Zorsch, 1937) — North America
 Tenuiphantes zimmermanni (Bertkau, 1890) — Europe, Russia

Ternatus
Ternatus Sun, Li & Tu, 2012
 Ternatus malleatus Sun, Li & Tu, 2012 — China
 Ternatus siculus Sun, Li & Tu, 2012 — China

Tessamoro
Tessamoro Eskov, 1993
 Tessamoro pallidus Eskov, 1993 — Russia

Thainetes
Thainetes Millidge, 1995
 Thainetes tristis Millidge, 1995 — Thailand

Thaiphantes
Thaiphantes Millidge, 1995
 Thaiphantes milneri Millidge, 1995 — Thailand
 Thaiphantes similis Millidge, 1995 — Thailand

Thaleria
Thaleria Tanasevitch, 1984
 Thaleria alnetorum Eskov & Marusik, 1992 — Russia
 Thaleria evenkiensis Eskov & Marusik, 1992 — Russia
 Thaleria leechi Eskov & Marusik, 1992 — Russia, Alaska
 Thaleria orientalis Tanasevitch, 1984 — Russia
 Thaleria sajanensis Eskov & Marusik, 1992 — Russia
 Thaleria sukatchevae Eskov & Marusik, 1992 — Russia

Thapsagus
Thapsagus Simon, 1894
 Thapsagus pulcher Simon, 1894 — Madagascar

Thaumatoncus
Thaumatoncus Simon, 1884
 Thaumatoncus indicator Simon, 1884 — France, Algeria, Tunisia
 Thaumatoncus secundus Bosmans, 2002 — Algeria

Theoa
Theoa Saaristo, 1995
 Theoa elegans Tanasevitch, 2014 — China, Thailand
 Theoa hamata Tanasevitch, 2014 — Thailand, Laos, Sumatra
 Theoa longicrusa Tanasevitch, 2014 — Thailand
 Theoa malaya Tanasevitch, 2017 — Malaysia (mainland)
 Theoa tricaudata (Locket, 1982) — Seychelles, Malaysia
 Theoa vesica Zhao & Li, 2014 — China

Theoneta
Theoneta Eskov & Marusik, 1991
 Theoneta aterrima (Eskov & Marusik, 1991) — Russia (north-eastern Siberia to Far East)
 Theoneta saaristoi (Eskov & Marusik, 1991) — Russia (north-eastern Siberia, Far East)

Theonina
Theonina Simon, 1929
 Theonina cornix (Simon, 1881) — Europe, North Africa, Russia
 Theonina kratochvili Miller & Weiss, 1979 — Central Europe to Russia
 Theonina laguncula (Denis, 1937) — Morocco, Algeria, Spain, Cyprus
 Theonina linyphioides (Denis, 1937) — Algeria

Thyreobaeus
Thyreobaeus Simon, 1889
 Thyreobaeus scutiger Simon, 1889 — Madagascar

Thyreosthenius
Thyreosthenius Simon, 1884
 Thyreosthenius biovatus (O. P.-Cambridge, 1875) — Palearctic
 Thyreosthenius parasiticus (Westring, 1851) — Holarctic

Tibiaster
Tibiaster Tanasevitch, 1987
 Tibiaster djanybekensis Tanasevitch, 1987 — Kazakhstan
 Tibiaster wunderlichi Eskov, 1995 — Kazakhstan

Tibioploides
Tibioploides Eskov & Marusik, 1991
 Tibioploides arcuatus (Tullgren, 1955) — Scandinavia, Russia, Estonia
 Tibioploides cyclicus Sha & Zhu, 1995 — China
 Tibioploides eskovianus Saito & Ono, 2001 — Japan
 Tibioploides kurenstchikovi Eskov & Marusik, 1991 — Russia
 Tibioploides monticola Saito & Ono, 2001 — Japan
 Tibioploides pacificus Eskov & Marusik, 1991 — Russia
 Tibioploides stigmosus (Xia et al., 2001) — Russia, China

Tibioplus
Tibioplus Chamberlin & Ivie, 1947
 Tibioplus diversus (L. Koch, 1879) — Scandinavia, Russia, Mongolia, Alaska
 Tibioplus tachygynoides Tanasevitch, 1989 — Kyrgyzstan

Tiso
Tiso Simon, 1884
 Tiso aestivus (L. Koch, 1872) — Holarctic
 Tiso biceps Gao, Zhu & Gao, 1993 — China
 Tiso camillus Tanasevitch, 1990 — Azerbaijan
 Tiso golovatchi Tanasevitch, 2006 — Russia
 Tiso incisus Tanasevitch, 2011 — India, Pakistan
 Tiso indianus Tanasevitch, 2011 — India
 Tiso megalops Caporiacco, 1935 — Karakorum
 Tiso vagans (Blackwall, 1834) — Europe, Russia

Tmeticodes
Tmeticodes Ono, 2010
 Tmeticodes gibbifer Ono, 2010 — Japan

Tmeticus
Tmeticus Menge, 1868
 Tmeticus affinis (Blackwall, 1855) — Holarctic
 Tmeticus neserigonoides Saito & Ono, 2001 — Japan
 Tmeticus nigerrimus Saito & Ono, 2001 — Japan
 Tmeticus nigriceps (Kulczynski, 1916) — Russia
 Tmeticus ornatus (Emerton, 1914) — USA, Canada
 Tmeticus tolli Kulczynski, 1908 — Russia, Mongolia, China, Sakhalin
 Tmeticus vulcanicus Saito & Ono, 2001 — Japan

Tojinium
Tojinium Saito & Ono, 2001
 Tojinium japonicum Saito & Ono, 2001 — Japan

Toltecaria
Toltecaria Miller, 2007
 Toltecaria antricola (Millidge, 1984) — Mexico

Tomohyphantes
Tomohyphantes Millidge, 1995
 Tomohyphantes niger Millidge, 1995 — Krakatau
 Tomohyphantes opacus Millidge, 1995 — Krakatau

Toschia
Toschia Caporiacco, 1949
 Toschia aberdarensis Holm, 1962 — Kenya
 Toschia casta Jocque & Scharff, 1986 — Tanzania
 Toschia celans Gao, Xing & Zhu, 1996 — China
 Toschia concolor Caporiacco, 1949 — Kenya
 Toschia cypericola Jocque, 1981 — Malawi
 Toschia minuta Jocque, 1984 — South Africa
 Toschia picta Caporiacco, 1949 — Congo, Kenya
 Toschia spinosa Holm, 1968 — Congo
 Toschia telekii Holm, 1962 — Kenya
 Toschia virgo Jocque & Scharff, 1986 — Tanzania

Totua
Totua Keyserling, 1891
 Totua gracilipes Keyserling, 1891 — Brazil

Trachyneta
Trachyneta Holm, 1968
 Trachyneta extensa Holm, 1968 — Congo
 Trachyneta jocquei Merrett, 2004 — Malawi

Traematosisis
Traematosisis Bishop & Crosby, 1938
 Traematosisis bispinosus (Emerton, 1911) — USA

Trematocephalus
Trematocephalus Dahl, 1886
 Trematocephalus cristatus (Wider, 1834) — Palearctic
 Trematocephalus obscurus Denis, 1950 — France
 Trematocephalus simplex Simon, 1894 — Sri Lanka
 Trematocephalus tripunctatus Simon, 1894 — Sri Lanka

Trichobactrus
Trichobactrus Wunderlich, 1995
 Trichobactrus brevispinosus Wunderlich, 1995 — Mongolia

Trichoncoides
Trichoncoides Denis, 1950
 Trichoncoides pilosus Denis, 1950 — France
 Trichoncoides piscator (Simon, 1884) — Palearctic
 Trichoncoides striganovae Tanasevitch & Piterkina, 2012 — Russia, Kazakhstan

Trichoncus
Trichoncus Simon, 1884
 Trichoncus affinis Kulczynski, 1894 — Palearctic
 Trichoncus ambrosii Wunderlich, 2011 — Switzerland, Italy
 Trichoncus aurantiipes Simon, 1884 — Portugal, Morocco, Algeria, Tunisia
 Trichoncus auritus (L. Koch, 1869) — Europe, Russia
 Trichoncus gibbulus Denis, 1944 — France
 Trichoncus hackmani Millidge, 1955 — Central, Northern Europe
 Trichoncus helveticus Denis, 1965 — Switzerland, France
 Trichoncus hirtus Denis, 1965 — Corsica
 Trichoncus hispidosus Tanasevitch, 1990 — Russia
 Trichoncus hyperboreus Eskov, 1992 — Russia
 Trichoncus kenyensis Thaler, 1974 — Kenya
 Trichoncus lanatus Tanasevitch, 1987 — Georgia
 Trichoncus maculatus Fei, Gao & Zhu, 1997 — China
 Trichoncus monticola Denis, 1965 — Spain
 Trichoncus nairobi Russell-Smith & Jocque, 1986 — Kenya
 Trichoncus orientalis Eskov, 1992 — Russia
 Trichoncus patrizii Caporiacco, 1953 — Italy
 Trichoncus pinguis Simon, 1926 — Spain
 Trichoncus rostralis Tanasevitch, 2013 — Israel
 Trichoncus saxicola (O. P.-Cambridge, 1861) — Europe, Russia
 Trichoncus scrofa Simon, 1884 — France, Mallorca, Italy
 Trichoncus similipes Denis, 1965 — Portugal
 Trichoncus sordidus Simon, 1884 — Europe
 Trichoncus steppensis Eskov, 1995 — Kazakhstan
 Trichoncus trifidus Denis, 1965 — Portugal
 Trichoncus uncinatus Denis, 1965 — Algeria
 Trichoncus varipes Denis, 1965 — Europe
 Trichoncus vasconicus Denis, 1944 — Palearctic
 Trichoncus villius Tanasevitch & Piterkina, 2007 — Kazakhstan

Trichoncyboides
Trichoncyboides Wunderlich, 2008
 Trichoncyboides simoni (Lessert, 1904) — Switzerland, Germany, Austria, Czech Republic

Trichopterna
Trichopterna Kulczynski, 1894
 Trichopterna cito (O. P.-Cambridge, 1872) — Palearctic
 Trichopterna cucurbitina (Simon, 1881) — Portugal, France
 Trichopterna grummi Tanasevitch, 1989 — Central Asia
 Trichopterna krueperi (Simon, 1884) — Greece
 Trichopterna loricata Denis, 1962 — Tanzania
 Trichopterna lucasi (O. P.-Cambridge, 1875) — Algeria
 Trichopterna macrophthalma Denis, 1962 — Tanzania
 Trichopterna rotundiceps Denis, 1962 — Tanzania
 Trichopterna seculifera Denis, 1962 — Tanzania

Trichopternoides
Trichopternoides Wunderlich, 2008
 Trichopternoides thorelli (Westring, 1861) — Palearctic

Triplogyna
Triplogyna Millidge, 1991
 Triplogyna ignitula (Keyserling, 1886) — Brazil
 Triplogyna major Millidge, 1991 — Colombia

Troglohyphantes
Troglohyphantes Joseph, 1881
 Troglohyphantes adjaricus Tanasevitch, 1987 — Georgia
 Troglohyphantes affinis (Kulczynski, 1914) — Croatia, Bosnia-Hercegovina
 Troglohyphantes affirmatus (Simon, 1913) — Spain
 Troglohyphantes albicaudatus Bosmans, 2006 — Algeria
 Troglohyphantes albopictus Pesarini, 1989 — Italy
 Troglohyphantes alluaudi Fage, 1919 — Spain
 Troglohyphantes apenninicus 	Isaia, Mammola & Pantini, 2017 — Italy
 Troglohyphantes balazuci Dresco, 1956 — France
 Troglohyphantes birsteini Charitonov, 1947 — Russia, Georgia
 Troglohyphantes bolivarorum Machado, 1939 — Spain
 Troglohyphantes bolognai Brignoli, 1975 — Italy
 Troglohyphantes bonzanoi Brignoli, 1979 — Italy
 Troglohyphantes bornensis Isaia & Pantini, 2008 — Italy
 Troglohyphantes boudewijni Deeleman-Reinhold, 1974 — Montenegro
 Troglohyphantes brevipes Deeleman-Reinhold, 1978 — Bosnia-Hercegovina
 Troglohyphantes brignolii Deeleman-Reinhold, 1978 — Italy, Croatia
 Troglohyphantes bureschianus Deltshev, 1975 — Bulgaria
 Troglohyphantes caecus Fage, 1919 — France
 Troglohyphantes caligatus Pesarini, 1989 — Switzerland, Italy
 Troglohyphantes cantabricus Simon, 1911 — Spain
 Troglohyphantes caporiaccoi Brignoli, 1971 — Italy
 Troglohyphantes cavadinii Pesarini, 1989 — Italy
 Troglohyphantes cerberus (Simon, 1884) — France
 Troglohyphantes charitonovi Tanasevitch, 1987 — Russia
 Troglohyphantes cirtensis (Simon, 1910) — Algeria
 Troglohyphantes comottii Pesarini, 1989 — Italy
 Troglohyphantes confusus Kratochvil, 1939 — Eastern Europe
 Troglohyphantes croaticus (Chyzer, 1894) — Eastern Europe
 Troglohyphantes cruentus Brignoli, 1971 — Slovenia
 Troglohyphantes dalmaticus (Kulczynski, 1914) — Croatia, Macedonia
 Troglohyphantes deelemanae Tanasevitch, 1987 — Georgia
 Troglohyphantes dekkingae Deeleman-Reinhold, 1978 — Bosnia-Hercegovina
 Troglohyphantes dekkingae pauciaculeatus Deeleman-Reinhold, 1978 — Bosnia-Hercegovina
 Troglohyphantes diabolicus Deeleman-Reinhold, 1978 — Slovenia
 Troglohyphantes dinaricus (Kratochvil, 1948) — Croatia
 Troglohyphantes diurnus Kratochvil, 1932 — Austria, Slovenia, Croatia
 Troglohyphantes dominici Pesarini, 1988 — Italy
 Troglohyphantes draconis Deeleman-Reinhold, 1978 — Macedonia
 Troglohyphantes drenskii Deltshev, 1973 — Bulgaria
 Troglohyphantes excavatus Fage, 1919 — Italy, Austria, Eastern Europe
 Troglohyphantes exul Thaler, 1987 — Italy
 Troglohyphantes fagei Roewer, 1931 — Germany, Austria, Italy
 Troglohyphantes fallax Deeleman-Reinhold, 1978 — Bosnia-Hercegovina
 Troglohyphantes fatalis Pesarini, 1988 — Italy
 Troglohyphantes fugax (Kulczynski, 1914) — Bosnia-Hercegovina
 Troglohyphantes furcifer (Simon, 1884) — Spain
 Troglohyphantes gamsi Deeleman-Reinhold, 1978 — Slovenia
 Troglohyphantes gestroi Fage, 1933 — Italy
 Troglohyphantes giachinoi Isaia & Mammola, 2018 — Italy
 Troglohyphantes giromettai (Kulczynski, 1914) — Croatia
 Troglohyphantes gladius Wunderlich, 1995 — Turkey
 Troglohyphantes gracilis Fage, 1919 — Slovenia
 Troglohyphantes gregori (Miller, 1947) — Czech Republic
 Troglohyphantes hadzii Kratochvil, 1934 — Bosnia-Hercegovina
 Troglohyphantes helsdingeni Deeleman-Reinhold, 1978 — Austria, Slovenia
 Troglohyphantes henroti Dresco, 1956 — France
 Troglohyphantes herculanus (Kulczynski, 1894) — Eastern Europe
 Troglohyphantes inermis Deeleman-Reinhold, 1978 — Macedonia
 Troglohyphantes iulianae Brignoli, 1971 — Italy
 Troglohyphantes jamatus Roewer, 1931 — Slovenia
 Troglohyphantes jeanneli Dumitrescu & Georgescu, 1970 — Romania
 Troglohyphantes juris Thaler, 1982 — Italy
 Troglohyphantes karawankorum Deeleman-Reinhold, 1978 — Austria, Slovenia
 Troglohyphantes karolianus Topçu, Türkes & Seyyar, 2008 — Turkey
 Troglohyphantes konradi Brignoli, 1975 — Italy
 Troglohyphantes kordunlikanus Deeleman-Reinhold, 1978 — Croatia
 Troglohyphantes kratochvili Drensky, 1935 — Macedonia
 Troglohyphantes labrada Wunderlich, 2012 — Canary Islands
 Troglohyphantes lakatnikensis Drensky, 1931 — Bulgaria
 Troglohyphantes lanai Isaia & Pantini, 2010 — Italy
 Troglohyphantes latzeli Thaler, 1986 — Austria
 Troglohyphantes lesserti Kratochvil, 1935 — Balkans
 Troglohyphantes lessinensis Caporiacco, 1936 — Italy
 Troglohyphantes liburnicus Caporiacco, 1927 — Balkans
 Troglohyphantes lucifer Isaia, Mammola & Pantini, 2017 — Italy
 Troglohyphantes lucifuga (Simon, 1884) — Europe
 Troglohyphantes marqueti (Simon, 1884) — France
 Troglohyphantes marqueti pauciaculeatus Simon, 1929 — France
 Troglohyphantes microcymbium Pesarini, 2001 — Italy
 Troglohyphantes milleri (Kratochvil, 1948) — Bosnia-Hercegovina
 Troglohyphantes montanus Absolon & Kratochvil, 1932 — Bosnia-Hercegovina
 Troglohyphantes nigraerosae Brignoli, 1971 — Italy
 Troglohyphantes noricus (Thaler & Polenec, 1974) — Germany, Austria
 Troglohyphantes novicordis Thaler, 1978 — Austria
 Troglohyphantes numidus (Simon, 1911) — Algeria
 Troglohyphantes nyctalops Simon, 1911 — Spain
 Troglohyphantes orghidani Dumitrescu & Georgescu, 1977 — Romania
 Troglohyphantes oromii (Ribera & Blasco, 1986) — Canary Islands
 Troglohyphantes orpheus (Simon, 1884) — France
 Troglohyphantes paulusi Thaler, 2002 — Iran
 Troglohyphantes pavesii Pesarini, 1988 — Italy
 Troglohyphantes pedemontanus (Gozo, 1908) — Italy
 Troglohyphantes phragmitis (Simon, 1884) — France
 Troglohyphantes pisidicus Brignoli, 1971 — Turkey
 Troglohyphantes pluto Caporiacco, 1938 — Italy
 Troglohyphantes poleneci Wiehle, 1964 — Italy, Slovenia
 Troglohyphantes polyophthalmus Joseph, 1881 — Slovenia
 Troglohyphantes pretneri Deeleman-Reinhold, 1978 — Montenegro
 Troglohyphantes pugnax Deeleman-Reinhold, 1978 — Bosnia-Hercegovina, Croatia
 Troglohyphantes pumilio Denis, 1959 — France
 Troglohyphantes pyrenaeus Simon, 1907 — France
 Troglohyphantes racovitzai Dumitrescu & Georgescu, 1970 — Romania
 Troglohyphantes regalini Pesarini, 1989 — Italy
 Troglohyphantes roberti Deeleman-Reinhold, 1978 — Croatia
 Troglohyphantes roberti dalmatensis Deeleman-Reinhold, 1978 — Croatia
 Troglohyphantes roquensis Barrientos & Fernández-Pérez, 2018 — Spain (Canary Islands)
 Troglohyphantes ruffoi Caporiacco, 1936 — Italy
 Troglohyphantes salax (Kulczynski, 1914) — Bosnia-Hercegovina, Croatia
 Troglohyphantes saouaf Bosmans, 2006 — Algeria, Tunisia
 Troglohyphantes sbordonii Brignoli, 1975 — Austria, Italy, Slovenia
 Troglohyphantes schenkeli (Miller, 1937) — Slovakia
 Troglohyphantes sciakyi Pesarini, 1989 — Italy
 Troglohyphantes scientificus Deeleman-Reinhold, 1978 — Italy, Slovenia
 Troglohyphantes similis Fage, 1919 — Slovenia
 Troglohyphantes simoni Fage, 1919 — France
 Troglohyphantes sketi Deeleman-Reinhold, 1978 — Slovenia, Croatia
 Troglohyphantes solitarius Fage, 1919 — France
 Troglohyphantes sordellii (Pavesi, 1875) — Switzerland, Italy
 Troglohyphantes spatulifer Pesarini, 2001 — Italy
 Troglohyphantes spinipes Fage, 1919 — Slovenia
 Troglohyphantes strandi Absolon & Kratochvil, 1932 — Croatia
 Troglohyphantes subalpinus Thaler, 1967 — Germany, Austria, Croatia
 Troglohyphantes svilajensis (Kratochvil, 1948) — Croatia
 Troglohyphantes svilajensis bosnicus (Kratochvil, 1948) — Bosnia-Hercegovina
 Troglohyphantes svilajensis noctiphilus (Kratochvil, 1948) — Croatia
 Troglohyphantes tauriscus Thaler, 1982 — Austria
 Troglohyphantes thaleri Miller & Polenec, 1975 — Austria, Slovenia
 Troglohyphantes trispinosus Miller & Polenec, 1975 — Slovenia
 Troglohyphantes troglodytes (Kulczynski, 1914) — Bosnia-Hercegovina, Croatia
 Troglohyphantes turcicus Topçu, Türkeş, Seyyar, Demircan & Karabulut, 2014 — Turkey
 Troglohyphantes typhlonetiformis Absolon & Kratochvil, 1932 — Austria, Slovenia
 Troglohyphantes vicinus Miller & Polenec, 1975 — Slovenia
 Troglohyphantes vignai Brignoli, 1971 — Italy
 Troglohyphantes wiebesi Deeleman-Reinhold, 1978 — Bosnia-Hercegovina
 Troglohyphantes wiehlei Miller & Polenec, 1975 — Austria, Eastern Europe
 Troglohyphantes zanoni Pesarini, 1988 — Italy

Troxochrota
Troxochrota Kulczynski, 1894
 Troxochrota kashmirica (Caporiacco, 1935) — Kashmir
 Troxochrota scabra Kulczynski, 1894 — Europe, Russia

Troxochrus
Troxochrus Simon, 1884
 Troxochrus apertus Tanasevitch, 2011 — Greece, Turkey
 Troxochrus laevithorax Miller, 1970 — Angola
 Troxochrus rugulosus (Westring, 1851) — Sweden
 Troxochrus scabriculus (Westring, 1851) — Palearctic
 Troxochrus triangularis Tanasevitch, 2013 — Israel

Tubercithorax
Tubercithorax Eskov, 1988
 Tubercithorax furcifer Eskov, 1988 — Russia
 Tubercithorax subarcticus (Tanasevitch, 1984) — Russia

Tunagyna
Tunagyna Chamberlin & Ivie, 1933
 Tunagyna debilis (Banks, 1892) — Russia, Alaska, Canada, USA

Turbinellina
Turbinellina Millidge, 1993
 Turbinellina nigra (Millidge, 1991) — Chile, Argentina

Turinyphia
Turinyphia van Helsdingen, 1982
 Turinyphia cavernicola Wunderlich, 2008 — Azores
 Turinyphia clairi (Simon, 1884) — Southern Europe
 Turinyphia maderiana (Schenkel, 1938) — Madeira
 Turinyphia yunohamensis (Bösenberg & Strand, 1906) — China, Korea, Japan

Tusukuru
Tusukuru Eskov, 1993
 Tusukuru hartlandianus (Emerton, 1913) — USA
 Tusukuru tamburinus Eskov, 1993 — Russia

Tutaibo
Tutaibo Chamberlin, 1916
 Tutaibo anglicanus (Hentz, 1850) — USA
 Tutaibo debilipes Chamberlin, 1916 — Peru
 Tutaibo formosus Millidge, 1991 — Peru
 Tutaibo fucosus (Keyserling, 1891) — Brazil
 Tutaibo niger (O. P.-Cambridge, 1882) — Brazil
 Tutaibo phoeniceus (O. P.-Cambridge, 1894) — Mexico, Guatemala
 Tutaibo pullus Millidge, 1991 — Colombia
 Tutaibo rubescens Millidge, 1991 — Colombia
 Tutaibo rusticellus (Keyserling, 1891) — Brazil
 Tutaibo velox (Keyserling, 1886) — Brazil

Tybaertiella
Tybaertiella Jocque, 1979
 Tybaertiella convexa (Holm, 1962) — West, Central, East Africa
 Tybaertiella krugeri (Simon, 1894) — Africa
 Tybaertiella peniculifera Jocque, 1979 — Ivory Coast, Nigeria, Ethiopia

Typhistes
Typhistes Simon, 1894
 Typhistes antilope Simon, 1894 — Sri Lanka
 Typhistes comatus Simon, 1894 — Sri Lanka
 Typhistes elephas Berland, 1922 — Ethiopia
 Typhistes gloriosus Jocque, 1984 — South Africa

Typhlonyphia
Typhlonyphia Kratochvil, 1936
 Typhlonyphia reimoseri Kratochvil, 1936 — Eastern Europe
 Typhlonyphia reimoseri meridionalis Kratochvil, 1978 — Croatia

Typhochrestinus
Typhochrestinus Eskov, 1990
 Typhochrestinus titulifer Eskov, 1990 — Russia

Typhochrestoides
Typhochrestoides Eskov, 1990
 Typhochrestoides baikalensis Eskov, 1990 — Russia

Typhochrestus
Typhochrestus Simon, 1884
 Typhochrestus acoreensis Wunderlich, 1992 — Azores
 Typhochrestus alticola Denis, 1953 — France
 Typhochrestus berniae Bosmans, 2008 — Spain
 Typhochrestus bifurcatus Simon, 1884 — Spain, Algeria
 Typhochrestus bogarti Bosmans, 1990 — Portugal, Spain, France, Morocco
 Typhochrestus brucei Tullgren, 1955 — Sweden
 Typhochrestus chiosensis Wunderlich, 1995 — Greece, Turkey
 Typhochrestus ciliiunti Barrientos & Febrer, 2018 — Spain (Menorca)
 Typhochrestus curvicervix (Denis, 1964) — Tunisia
 Typhochrestus cyrenanius Denis, 1964 — Libya
 Typhochrestus digitatus (O. P.-Cambridge, 1872) — Palearctic
 Typhochrestus djellalensis Bosmans & Bouragba, 1992 — Algeria
 Typhochrestus dubius Denis, 1949 — France
 Typhochrestus epidaurensis Wunderlich, 1995 — Greece
 Typhochrestus fortunatus Thaler, 1984 — Canary Islands
 Typhochrestus hesperius Thaler, 1984 — Canary Islands
 Typhochrestus ikarianus Tanasevitch, 2011 — Greece
 Typhochrestus inflatus Thaler, 1980 — Switzerland to Central Asia
 Typhochrestus longisulcus Gnelitsa, 2006 — Ukraine
 Typhochrestus mauretanicus Bosmans, 1990 — Morocco, Algeria
 Typhochrestus meron Tanasevitch, 2013 — Israel
 Typhochrestus montanus Wunderlich, 1987 — Canary Islands
 Typhochrestus numidicus Bosmans, 1990 — Algeria
 Typhochrestus paradorensis Wunderlich, 1987 — Canary Islands
 Typhochrestus sardus Bosmans, 2008 — Sardinia
 Typhochrestus simoni Lessert, 1907 — Europe
 Typhochrestus sireti Bosmans, 2008 — Spain
 Typhochrestus spatulatus Bosmans, 1990 — Morocco, Algeria
 Typhochrestus splendidus Bosmans, 1990 — Algeria
 Typhochrestus sylviae Hauge, 1968 — Norway
 Typhochrestus uintanus (Chamberlin & Ivie, 1939) — USA
 Typhochrestus ultimus Bosmans, 1990 — Algeria
 Typhochrestus virilis Bosmans, 1990 — Algeria

Uahuka
Uahuka Berland, 1935
 Uahuka affinis Berland, 1935 — Marquesas Islands
 Uahuka spinifrons Berland, 1935 — Marquesas Islands

Uapou
Uapou Berland, 1935
 Uapou maculata Berland, 1935 — Marquesas Islands

Ulugurella
Ulugurella Jocque & Scharff, 1986
 Ulugurella longimana Jocque & Scharff, 1986 — Tanzania

Ummeliata
Ummeliata Strand, 1942
 Ummeliata angulituberis (Oi, 1960) — Russia, Korea, Japan
 Ummeliata erigonoides (Oi, 1960) — Japan
 Ummeliata feminea (Bösenberg & Strand, 1906) — Russia, China, Korea, Japan
 Ummeliata insecticeps (Bösenberg & Strand, 1906) — Russia to Vietnam, Taiwan, Japan
 Ummeliata onoi Saito, 1993 — Japan
 Ummeliata osakaensis (Oi, 1960) — Russia, Japan
 Ummeliata saitoi Matsuda & Ono, 2001 — Japan
 Ummeliata sibirica (Eskov, 1980) — Russia
 Ummeliata xiaowutai Han & Zhang, 2014 — China

Uralophantes
Uralophantes Esyunin, 1992
 Uralophantes troitskensis Esyunin, 1992 — Russia

Ussurigone
Ussurigone Eskov, 1993
 Ussurigone melanocephala Eskov, 1993 — Russia

Uusitaloia
Uusitaloia Marusik, Koponen & Danilov, 2001
 Uusitaloia transbaicalica Marusik, Koponen & Danilov, 2001 — Russia
 Uusitaloia wrangeliana Marusik & Koponen, 2009 — Russia

Vagiphantes
Vagiphantes Saaristo & Tanasevitch, 2004
 Vagiphantes vaginatus (Tanasevitch, 1983) — Central Asia

Venia
Venia Seyfulina & Jocque, 2009
 Venia kakamega Seyfulina & Jocque, 2009 — Kenya

Vermontia
Vermontia Millidge, 1984
 Vermontia thoracica (Emerton, 1913) — USA, Canada, Russia

Vesicapalpus
Vesicapalpus Millidge, 1991
 Vesicapalpus serranus Rodrigues & Ott, 2006 — Brazil
 Vesicapalpus simplex Millidge, 1991 — Brazil, Argentina

Vietnagone
Vietnagone Tanasevitch, 2019
 Vietnagone rugulosa (Song & Li, 2010) — China
 Vietnagone sylvatica Tanasevitch, 2019 — Vietnam

Viktorium
Viktorium Eskov, 1988
 Viktorium putoranicum Eskov, 1988 — Russia

Wabasso
Wabasso Millidge, 1984
 Wabasso cacuminatus Millidge, 1984 — Russia, Canada, USA
 Wabasso hilairoides Eskov, 1988 — Russia
 Wabasso koponeni Tanasevitch, 2006 — Russia
 Wabasso millidgei Eskov, 1988 — Russia
 Wabasso quaestio (Chamberlin, 1949) — Canada, Greenland
 Wabasso replicatus (Holm, 1950) — Scotland to Russia
 Wabasso saaristoi Tanasevitch, 2006 — Russia
 Wabasso tungusicus Eskov, 1988 — Russia

Walckenaeria
Walckenaeria Blackwall, 1833
 Walckenaeria abantensis Wunderlich, 1995 — Greece, Turkey
 Walckenaeria aberdarensis (Holm, 1962) — Kenya
 Walckenaeria acuminata Blackwall, 1833 — Palearctic
 Walckenaeria aenea Millidge, 1983 — Mexico
 Walckenaeria afur Thaler, 1984 — Canary Islands
 Walckenaeria aksoyi Seyyar, Demir & Türkes, 2008 — Turkey
 Walckenaeria alba Wunderlich, 1987 — Canary Islands
 Walckenaeria allopatriae Jocque & Scharff, 1986 — Tanzania
 Walckenaeria alticeps (Denis, 1952) — Europe to Central Asia
 Walckenaeria anceps Millidge, 1983 — Canada
 Walckenaeria angelica Millidge, 1979 — Italy
 Walckenaeria angustifrons (Simon, 1884) — France
 Walckenaeria antica (Wider, 1834) — Palearctic
 Walckenaeria aprilis Millidge, 1983 — USA
 Walckenaeria arcana Millidge, 1983 — Mexico
 Walckenaeria arctica Millidge, 1983 — USA, Canada
 Walckenaeria asymmetrica Song & Li, 2011 — China
 Walckenaeria atrotibialis (O. P.-Cambridge, 1878) — Holarctic
 Walckenaeria auranticeps (Emerton, 1882) — Russia, Canada, USA
 Walckenaeria aurata Millidge, 1983 — Mexico
 Walckenaeria baborensis Bosmans, 1993 — Algeria
 Walckenaeria basarukini Eskov & Marusik, 1994 — Russia
 Walckenaeria bifasciculata Tanasevitch, 1987 — Azerbaijan, Armenia
 Walckenaeria bifida Millidge, 1983 — USA
 Walckenaeria blanda Millidge, 1983 — USA
 Walckenaeria breviaria (Crosby & Bishop, 1931) — USA
 Walckenaeria brevicornis (Emerton, 1882) — USA
 Walckenaeria brucei (Tullgren, 1955) — Sweden
 Walckenaeria camposi Wunderlich, 1992 — Canary Islands
 Walckenaeria caobangensis Tu & Li, 2004 — Vietnam
 Walckenaeria capito (Westring, 1861) — Holarctic
 Walckenaeria carolina Millidge, 1983 — USA
 Walckenaeria castanea (Emerton, 1882) — USA, Canada
 Walckenaeria cavernicola Wunderlich, 1992 — Canary Islands
 Walckenaeria chikunii Saito & Ono, 2001 — Japan
 Walckenaeria chiyokoae Saito, 1988 — Japan
 Walckenaeria christae Wunderlich, 1995 — Greece
 Walckenaeria cirriceps Thaler, 1996 — Greece
 Walckenaeria clavicornis (Emerton, 1882) — Holarctic
 Walckenaeria claviloba Wunderlich, 1995 — Crete
 Walckenaeria clavipalpis Millidge, 1983 — USA, Canada
 Walckenaeria cognata Holm, 1984 — Tanzania
 Walckenaeria columbia Millidge, 1983 — USA, Canada
 Walckenaeria communis (Emerton, 1882) — USA, Canada, Alaska
 Walckenaeria coniceps Thaler, 1996 — Greece
 Walckenaeria coreana (Paik, 1983) — Korea
 Walckenaeria corniculans (O. P.-Cambridge, 1875) — Europe, North Africa
 Walckenaeria cornuella (Chamberlin & Ivie, 1939) — USA, Canada
 Walckenaeria cretaensis Wunderlich, 1995 — Crete
 Walckenaeria crocata (Simon, 1884) — Canary Islands, Algeria
 Walckenaeria crocea Millidge, 1983 — Mexico
 Walckenaeria crosbyi (Fage, 1938) — Costa Rica
 Walckenaeria cucullata (C. L. Koch, 1836) — Palearctic
 Walckenaeria cuspidata Blackwall, 1833 — Palearctic
 Walckenaeria cuspidata brevicula (Crosby & Bishop, 1931) — USA, Canada, Alaska, Greenland
 Walckenaeria cuspidata obsoleta Chyzer & Kulczynski, 1894 — Hungary
 Walckenaeria cyprusensis Wunderlich, 1995 — Cyprus
 Walckenaeria dahaituoensis Song & Li, 2011 — China
 Walckenaeria dalmasi (Simon, 1914) — Portugal, France
 Walckenaeria denisi Thaler, 1984 — Canary Islands
 Walckenaeria digitata (Emerton, 1913) — USA, Canada
 Walckenaeria directa (O. P.-Cambridge, 1874) — USA, Canada, Alaska
 Walckenaeria discolor Millidge, 1983 — Mexico
 Walckenaeria dixiana (Chamberlin & Ivie, 1944) — USA
 Walckenaeria dondalei Millidge, 1983 — Canada
 Walckenaeria dulciacensis (Denis, 1949) — France
 Walckenaeria dysderoides (Wider, 1834) — Palearctic
 Walckenaeria elgonensis Holm, 1984 — Kenya, Uganda
 Walckenaeria emarginata Millidge, 1983 — USA
 Walckenaeria erythrina (Simon, 1884) — Corsica, Morocco, Algeria, Tunisia
 Walckenaeria exigua Millidge, 1983 — USA, Canada
 Walckenaeria extraterrestris Bosmans, 1993 — Algeria, Greece
 Walckenaeria faceta Millidge, 1983 — Mexico
 Walckenaeria fallax Millidge, 1983 — Canada
 Walckenaeria ferruginea Seo, 1991 — China, Korea
 Walckenaeria floridiana Millidge, 1983 — USA
 Walckenaeria fraudatrix Millidge, 1983 — Russia, Mongolia, Alaska, Canada
 Walckenaeria furcillata (Menge, 1869) — Palearctic
 Walckenaeria fusca Rosca, 1935 — Romania, Ukraine
 Walckenaeria fusciceps Millidge, 1983 — Canada
 Walckenaeria fuscocephala Wunderlich, 1987 — Canary Islands
 Walckenaeria galilea 	Tanasevitch, 2016 — ISrael
 Walckenaeria gertschi Millidge, 1983 — Mexico
 Walckenaeria gologolensis Scharff, 1990 — Tanzania
 Walckenaeria golovatchi Eskov & Marusik, 1994 — Russia, Japan
 Walckenaeria gomerensis Wunderlich, 1987 — Canary Islands
 Walckenaeria grancanariensis Wunderlich, 2011 — Canary Islands
 Walckenaeria grandis (Wunderlich, 1992) — Azores
 Walckenaeria hamus Wunderlich, 1995 — Crete
 Walckenaeria heimbergi Bosmans, 2007 — Morocco
 Walckenaeria helenae Millidge, 1983 — USA
 Walckenaeria hierropalma Wunderlich, 1987 — Canary Islands
 Walckenaeria ichifusaensis Saito & Ono, 2001 — Japan
 Walckenaeria incisa (O. P.-Cambridge, 1871) — Europe
 Walckenaeria incompleta Wunderlich, 1992 — Canary Islands
 Walckenaeria indirecta (O. P.-Cambridge, 1874) — USA, Canada
 Walckenaeria inflexa (Westring, 1861) — Sweden
 Walckenaeria insperata Millidge, 1979 — Italy
 Walckenaeria intoleranda (Keyserling, 1886) — Costa Rica, Panama, Colombia
 Walckenaeria iviei Millidge, 1983 — Mexico
 Walckenaeria jinlin Yin & Bao, 2012 — China
 Walckenaeria jocquei Holm, 1984 — Malawi
 Walckenaeria kabyliana Bosmans, 1993 — Algeria
 Walckenaeria karpinskii (O. P.-Cambridge, 1873) — Holarctic
 Walckenaeria katanda Marusik, Hippa & Koponen, 1996 — Russia, Kazakhstan
 Walckenaeria kazakhstanica Eskov, 1995 — Russia, Kazakhstan
 Walckenaeria kikogensis Scharff, 1990 — Tanzania
 Walckenaeria kochi (O. P.-Cambridge, 1872) — Palearctic, Quebec
 Walckenaeria koenboutjei Baert, 1994 — Russia
 Walckenaeria korobeinikovi Esyunin & Efimik, 1996 — Russia, Japan
 Walckenaeria kulalensis Holm, 1984 — Kenya
 Walckenaeria languida (Simon, 1914) — Southern, Central Europe, North Africa
 Walckenaeria latens Millidge, 1983 — USA
 Walckenaeria lepida (Kulczynski, 1885) — Holarctic
 Walckenaeria maesta Millidge, 1983 — USA
 Walckenaeria mariannae Bosmans, 1993 — Algeria
 Walckenaeria martensi Wunderlich, 1972 — India, Nepal
 Walckenaeria mauensis Holm, 1984 — Kenya
 Walckenaeria mengei Bösenberg, 1902 — Germany
 Walckenaeria meruensis Tullgren, 1910 — Tanzania
 Walckenaeria mesus (Chamberlin, 1949) — USA
 Walckenaeria mexicana Millidge, 1983 — Mexico
 Walckenaeria microps Holm, 1984 — Kenya, Uganda
 Walckenaeria microspinosa Wunderlich, 2012 — Canary Islands
 Walckenaeria microspiralis Millidge, 1983 — USA, Canada
 Walckenaeria minuscula Holm, 1984 — Kenya
 Walckenaeria minuta (Emerton, 1882) — USA
 Walckenaeria mitrata (Menge, 1868) — Palearctic
 Walckenaeria monoceras (Chamberlin & Ivie, 1947) — USA, Alaska
 Walckenaeria monoceros (Wider, 1834) — Europe to Kyrgyzstan
 Walckenaeria neglecta Bosmans, 1993 — Algeria
 Walckenaeria ngorongoroensis Holm, 1984 — Tanzania
 Walckenaeria nigeriensis Locket & Russell-Smith, 1980 — Nigeria, Kenya
 Walckenaeria nishikawai Saito, 1986 — Russia, Japan
 Walckenaeria nodosa O. P.-Cambridge, 1873 — Palearctic
 Walckenaeria nudipalpis (Westring, 1851) — Palearctic
 Walckenaeria obtusa Blackwall, 1836 — Palearctic
 Walckenaeria occidentalis Millidge, 1983 — USA
 Walckenaeria ocularis Holm, 1984 — Kenya
 Walckenaeria oregona Millidge, 1983 — USA
 Walckenaeria orghidani Georgescu, 1977 — Cuba
 Walckenaeria orientalis (Oliger, 1985) — Russia, Korea, Japan
 Walckenaeria pallida (Emerton, 1882) — USA, Canada
 Walckenaeria palmgreni Eskov & Marusik, 1994 — Russia, Mongolia
 Walckenaeria palmierro Wunderlich, 1987 — Canary Islands
 Walckenaeria palustris Millidge, 1983 — Canada
 Walckenaeria parvicornis Wunderlich, 1995 — Mongolia
 Walckenaeria pellax Millidge, 1983 — USA, Canada, Alaska
 Walckenaeria perdita (Chamberlin, 1949) — USA
 Walckenaeria picetorum (Palmgren, 1976) — Finland, Russia
 Walckenaeria pinocchio (Kaston, 1945) — USA, Canada
 Walckenaeria pinoensis Wunderlich, 1992 — Canary Islands
 Walckenaeria placida (Banks, 1892) — USA
 Walckenaeria plumata Millidge, 1979 — Italy
 Walckenaeria prominens Millidge, 1983 — Canada
 Walckenaeria puella Millidge, 1983 — USA
 Walckenaeria pullata Millidge, 1983 — USA, Canada
 Walckenaeria pyrenaea (Denis, 1952) — France
 Walckenaeria reclusa Millidge, 1983 — USA
 Walckenaeria redneri Millidge, 1983 — USA, Canada
 Walckenaeria rufula Millidge, 1983 — Mexico
 Walckenaeria rutilis Millidge, 1983 — Mexico
 Walckenaeria ruwenzoriensis (Holm, 1962) — Congo, Uganda
 Walckenaeria saetigera Tanasevitch, 2011 — India
 Walckenaeria saniuana (Chamberlin & Ivie, 1939) — USA
 Walckenaeria serrata Millidge, 1983 — USA
 Walckenaeria simplex Chyzer, 1894 — Central, Eastern Europe
 Walckenaeria solivaga Millidge, 1983 — USA
 Walckenaeria spiralis (Emerton, 1882) — Russia, Alaska, Canada, USA
 Walckenaeria stepposa Tanasevitch & Piterkina, 2007 — Kazakhstan
 Walckenaeria striata Wunderlich, 1987 — Canary Islands
 Walckenaeria stylifrons (O. P.-Cambridge, 1875) — Europe
 Walckenaeria subdirecta Millidge, 1983 — USA, Canada
 Walckenaeria subpallida Millidge, 1983 — USA
 Walckenaeria subspiralis Millidge, 1983 — USA, Canada
 Walckenaeria subterranea Wunderlich, 2011 — Canary Islands
 Walckenaeria subvigilax Millidge, 1983 — USA
 Walckenaeria suspecta (Kulczynski, 1882) — Poland, Slovakia
 Walckenaeria tanzaniensis Jocque & Scharff, 1986 — Tanzania
 Walckenaeria teideensis Wunderlich, 1992 — Canary Islands
 Walckenaeria tenella Millidge, 1983 — USA, Canada
 Walckenaeria tenuitibialis Bosmans, 1993 — Algeria
 Walckenaeria teres Millidge, 1983 — Canada
 Walckenaeria thrinax (Chamberlin & Ivie, 1933) — USA
 Walckenaeria tibialis (Emerton, 1882) — USA, Canada
 Walckenaeria tilos Wunderlich, 2011 — Canary Islands
 Walckenaeria torta Bosmans, 1993 — Algeria
 Walckenaeria tricornis (Emerton, 1882) — USA, Canada
 Walckenaeria tumida (Crosby & Bishop, 1931) — USA, Canada
 Walckenaeria turbulenta Bosmans, 1993 — Algeria
 Walckenaeria tystchenkoi Eskov & Marusik, 1994 — Russia
 Walckenaeria uenoi Saito & Irie, 1992 — Japan
 Walckenaeria unicornis O. P.-Cambridge, 1861 — Palearctic
 Walckenaeria uzungwensis Scharff, 1990 — Tanzania
 Walckenaeria vigilax (Blackwall, 1853) — Holarctic
 Walckenaeria vilbasteae Wunderlich, 1979 — Finland, Estonia
 Walckenaeria weber (Chamberlin, 1949) — USA
 Walckenaeria westringi Strand, 1903 — Norway
 Walckenaeria wunderlichi Tanasevitch, 1983 — Central Asia
 Walckenaeria yunnanensis Xia et al., 2001 — China

Walckenaerianus
Walckenaerianus Wunderlich, 1995
 Walckenaerianus aimakensis Wunderlich, 1995 — Russia, Mongolia
 Walckenaerianus esyunini Tanasevitch, 2004 — Bulgaria, Russia, Kazakhstan

Wiehlea
Wiehlea Braun, 1959
 Wiehlea calcarifera (Simon, 1884) — Western Europe

Wiehlenarius
Wiehlenarius Eskov, 1990
 Wiehlenarius boreus Eskov, 1990 — Russia
 Wiehlenarius tirolensis (Schenkel, 1939) — Switzerland, Austria, Greece

Wubana
Wubana Chamberlin, 1919
 Wubana atypica Chamberlin & Ivie, 1936 — USA
 Wubana drassoides (Emerton, 1882) — USA
 Wubana ornata Chamberlin & Ivie, 1936 — USA
 Wubana pacifica (Banks, 1896) — USA
 Wubana reminiscens Chamberlin, 1949 — USA
 Wubana suprema Chamberlin & Ivie, 1936 — USA
 Wubana utahana Chamberlin & Ivie, 1936 — USA

Wubanoides
Wubanoides Eskov, 1986
 Wubanoides fissus (Kulczynski, 1926) — Russia, Japan
 Wubanoides uralensis (Pakhorukov, 1981) — Russia, Mongolia
 Wubanoides uralensis lithodytes Schikora, 2004 — Central, Eastern Europe

Yakutopus
Yakutopus Eskov, 1990
 Yakutopus xerophilus Eskov, 1990 — Russia

Yuelushannus
Yuelushannus Irfan, Zhou, Bashir, Mukhtar & Peng, 2020
 Yuelushannus alatus Irfan, Zhou, Bashir, Mukhtar & Peng, 2020 — China
 Yuelushannus barbatus Irfan, Zhou, Bashir, Mukhtar & Peng, 2020 — China

Zerogone
Zerogone Eskov & Marusik, 1994
 Zerogone submissella (Strand, 1907) — Russia

Zhezhoulinyphia
Zhezhoulinyphia Irfan, Zhou & Peng, 2019
 Zhezhoulinyphia caperata Irfan, Zhou & Peng, 2019 — China
 Zhezhoulinyphia denticulata Irfan, Zhou & Peng, 2019 — China
 Zhezhoulinyphia yadongensis (Hu & Li, 1987) — China

Zilephus
Zilephus Simon, 1902
 Zilephus granulosus Simon, 1902 — Argentina

Zornella
Zornella Jackson, 1932
 Zornella armata (Banks, 1906) — USA, Canada, Alaska
 Zornella cryptodon (Chamberlin, 1920) — USA, Canada
 Zornella cultrigera (L. Koch, 1879) — Palearctic

Zygottus
Zygottus Chamberlin, 1949
 Zygottus corvallis Chamberlin, 1949 — USA
 Zygottus oregonus Chamberlin, 1949 — USA

See also
List of Linyphiidae species (A–H)
List of Linyphiidae species (I–P)

References

Lists of spider species by family